Heaven, Love and Twine (German: Himmel, Amor und Zwirn) is a 1960 West German comedy film directed by Ulrich Erfurth and starring Hartmut Reck, Ann Smyrner and Hannelore Schroth. It is based on the 1952 novel of the same title by Thomas Westa.

Cast
 Hartmut Reck as Friedrich Himmel
 Ann Smyrner as Gerti
 Grit Boettcher as Susanne Himmel
 Hannelore Schroth as Madame Riffi
 Elke Sommer as Eva
 Ursula Grabley as Frau Kronberg
 Romana Rombach as Frau Haberstein
 Richard Münch as Major Knorr
 Heinrich Gretler as Feller Hansi
 Lutz Moik as Erich Hofmann
 Gisela von Collande as Frau Knorr
 Thomas Braut as Oberleutnant Allgeier
 Ursula Herwig as Frau Allgeier
 Albert Rueprecht as Leutnant Kosmehl
 Joost Siedhoff as Oberfeldwebel Schohmeier

References

Bibliography
 Goble, Alan. The Complete Index to Literary Sources in Film. Walter de Gruyter, 1999.

External links
 

1960 films
1960 comedy films
German comedy films
West German films
1960s German-language films
Military humor in film
Films directed by Ulrich Erfurth
1960s German films